Sir John Emsley Fretwell,  (15 June 1930 – 30 March 2017) was a British diplomat.

Career
Fretwell was educated at Chesterfield Grammar School, the University of Lausanne and King's College, Cambridge. He served in the Royal Regiment of Artillery 1948–50 and joined the Diplomatic Service in 1953. He served in Hong Kong, Peking, Moscow and Washington, D.C., as Commercial Counsellor in Warsaw 1971–73, at the Foreign and Commonwealth Office in London as Head of the European Integration Department 1973–76 and as Assistant Under-Secretary 1976–79. He was Minister in Washington, D.C. 1980–81, British Ambassador to France 1982–87 and Political Director and Deputy to the Permanent Under-Secretary of State for Foreign and Commonwealth Affairs 1987–90.

After retiring from the Diplomatic Service, Fretwell was a member of the Council of Lloyd's 1991–92, specialist adviser to the House of Lords 1992–93 and specialist assessor for the Higher Education Funding Council 1995–96. He was also chairman of the Franco-British Society 1995–2005.

Fretwell was appointed CMG in 1975, knighted KCMG in 1982, and promoted to GCMG in 1987.

He died on 30 March 2017 at the age of 86.

Personal life
In 1959 Fretwell married Mary Dubois, who as Lady Fretwell founded "Passports for Pets" to create an alternative to the quarantine system for cats and dogs entering and returning to the UK. She was appointed OBE in the 2001 New Year Honours for services to pet owners and animal welfare.
They adopted  Emma Jane Fretwell and Charles Benjamin Fretwell. Emma married in 1996 to Nick Plumbridge and had 3 children, which are Sir John and Lady Mary's only grandchildren, Jessica Mary Plumbridge (1997), Isobel Grace Plumbridge (1999), and Lucy Catherine Plumbridge (2001).

References

 FRETWELL, Sir (Major) John (Emsley), Who's Who 2012, A & C Black, 2012; online edn, Oxford University Press, Dec 2011, accessed 7 March 2012

External links
Interview with Sir John Emsley Fretwell & transcript, British Diplomatic Oral History Programme, Churchill College, Cambridge, 1996

1930 births
2017 deaths
People educated at Chesterfield Grammar School
University of Lausanne alumni
Alumni of King's College, Cambridge
Ambassadors of the United Kingdom to France
Knights Grand Cross of the Order of St Michael and St George